Barkol Airlines is a large Russian charter airline based in Moscow that carries out VIP charter flights (both on its own aircraft and on those leased from other airlines) as well as patrols of power, gas and oil lines, forest patrols, aerial photography and crop spraying (on its Antonov An-2, Mil Mi-2 and Mil Mi-8 aircraft).

Finances
Year-on-year, net operating revenues increased by 15.46%, from RUB 1,098,632,000 to RUB 1,268,526,000 from 2009 to 2010. Operating result decreased, by 20.18% from RUB 45,427,000 to RUB 36,261,000.

Region served
Western (European) Russia is served up to the area bordered to the east by Khanty-Mansiysk and Salekhard.

Fleet

References

External links
Barkol web site

Airlines of Russia
Airlines established in 1996
Companies based in Moscow